Psychiko is a suburb of Athens, Greece. Since the 2011 local government reform it is part of the municipality Filothei-Psychiko, of which it is the seat and a municipal unit.

Overview
Psychiko is located 5 km northeast of Athens city centre. It is a strictly residential suburb of Athens, with commercial businesses allowed only within two small designated zones, the "Nea Agora" (New Market) and the "Palaia Agora" (Old Market), with current regulations also restricting buildings to full detachment, and a maximum of 3 floors. Psychiko was historically the home of aristocrats, members of the Greek royal family, and generally old money people. The area remains one of the wealthiest suburbs of Athens, with very high land value, and a number of embassies, particularly of rich Middle Eastern countries, to be found located in Psychiko, and neighbouring Filothei. This was once home to Queen Frederica of the Hellenes, until the military coup d'état of 1967. Andreas Papandreou and his wife Margaret also lived in Psychiko before the dictatorship. Later, when he became Prime Minister he left Psychiko and moved to Ekali. In recent decades however, many prominent families choose to build their houses in the southern, seaside suburbs, like Glyfada or Vouliagmeni. A number of private schools are located in Psychiko: Athens College and Psychiko College, Moraitis School, the Arsakeio, and the Varvakeio.

Name
The name literally means "an act of charity". A popular legend about the battle of Marathon and the Marathon run was recorded by Andreas Karkavitsas in the 19th century, and also by Linos Politis.

Historical population

Notable people
Constantine II of Greece, former King of the Hellenes; also competed in the 1960 Summer Olympics in Rome, winning a gold medal.
Princess Sophia of Greece and Denmark, later Queen Sofía of Spain, sister of Constantine II.
Nikos Dimou, writer.
Bobolas family, editor and co-owners of Ellaktor
Babis Vovos, former billionaire and owner of the construction group Babis Vovos S.A..

Embassies and consulates
Psychiko is home to many embassies.

 State

Consulates

See also
List of municipalities of Attica

References

External links
 Municipal Website 
Psychiko Cultural Center 

Battle of Marathon
Populated places in North Athens (regional unit)